Alchip is a fabless semiconductor company founded in 2003 and headquartered in Taipei, Taiwan.  Alchip specializes in the design and manufacture of digital CMOS ASICs.

Location 
Alchip's headquarters is in Taipei, Taiwan. Alchip also has locations in Santa Clara, California, Shin-Yokohama, Japan, Shanghai/ Wuxi/Hefei/Jinan, China, and Hsinchu, Taiwan.

History 
In April 2002 Cadence acquired Simplex Solutions, an ASIC design services company.
Alchip was founded six months later by Kinying Kwan and other former Simplex employees as a fabless ASIC supplier. Simplex Solutions had gained notoriety for designing the graphics ASIC for Sony's PS2 game console. Sony became an important customer of Alchip as well. In 2006 80% of Alchip's revenues were from Japan, and most of that was from Sony. In September 2008 Alchip's relationship with Sony took another step forward when it was announced that it would partner with Sony's microelectronics to provide packaging solutions for Alchip's customer's ASICs.  Over the past decade, Alchip has received investments from several tech heavyweights, including Global Future Group, Investar, AcerVC, Cisco Systems, C2Capital, and notably Taiwan Semiconductor Manufacturing Company (TSMC), the biggest contract chipmaker in the world, owns a 20% stake in the firm.
On December 23, 2010, Alchip went public and was listed on the Taiwan Emergent Market under the stock ticker number 3661. 
On October 28, 2014, Alchip debuted on the Taiwan Stock Exchange's main market.  This move opened Alchip to institutional and private investors and boosted its profile within the industry.

In April 2021 the US Government blacklisted seven Chinese supercomputing companies due to alleged involvement in supplying equipment to the PLA, Chinese military–industrial complex, and WMD programs. In response Alchip and TSMC suspended new orders from Chinese supercomputing company Tianjin Phytium Information Technology. Phytium accounted for 39% of Alchip’s revenue.

Products 
Alchip provides physical design, design for test insertion, package design, product qualification, IP licensing, and manufacturing services for digital CMOS ASICs. Alchip has announced products in 180 nm, 130 nm, 90 nm, 65 nm, 40 nm, 32 nm, 28 nm, and 16 nm process technologies. Customer ASICs have been announced in a wide range of applications including medical image processing, supercomputing, crypto-mining and networking.

Manufacturing 
Alchip adopts an open foundry model and outsources semiconductor manufacturing to TSMC, UMC, SMIC, and Samsung.  It also works with captive fab such as SONY and Toshiba. As of 2014, over 85% of Alchip projects are outsourced to TSMC. Alchip also outsources packaging, assembly, and testing. Alchip owns a Verigy 93K tester platform on which it performs test development and the test of ASIC prototypes.

See also
 List of companies of Taiwan
 Semiconductor industry in Taiwan

References

External links 
Alchip homepage

2003 establishments in Taiwan
Companies based in Taipei
Electronics companies established in 2003
Semiconductor companies of Taiwan
Fabless semiconductor companies
Taiwanese brands